is a Japanese manga series written and illustrated by Masaki Sato. It was serialized in Shogakukan's seinen manga magazine Monthly Sunday Gene-X from March 2009 to February 2012, with its chapters collected in five tankōbon volumes.

Publication
Written and illustrated by Masaki Sato, Tsuri Chichi Nagisa was serialized in Shogakukan's seinen manga magazine Monthly Sunday Gene-X from March 19, 2009, to February 19, 2012. Shogakukan collected its chapters in five tankōbon volumes, released from November 19, 2009, to April 19, 2012.

Volume list

References

External links
 

Comedy anime and manga
Fishing in anime and manga
Seinen manga
Shogakukan manga